The 2019–20 season was Leicester City's 115th in the English football league system and their 52nd (non-consecutive) season in the top tier of English football. This was their sixth consecutive season in the Premier League. They also competed in the FA Cup and EFL Cup. The season covered the period from 1 July 2019 to 26 July 2020.

Kits

Transfers

Transfers in

Loans in

Loans out

Transfers out

First team squad

Friendlies

Competitions

Overview

Premier League

League table

Results summary

Results by matchday

Matches
The Premier League fixtures were announced on 13 June 2019.

FA Cup

The third round draw was made live on BBC Two from Etihad Stadium, Micah Richards and Tony Adams conducted the draw. The fourth round draw was made by Alex Scott and David O'Leary on Monday, 6 January. The draw for the fifth round was made on 27 January 2020, live on The One Show.

EFL Cup

The second round draw was made on 13 August 2019 following the conclusion of all but one first round matches. The third round draw was confirmed on 28 August 2019, live on Sky Sports. The draw for the fourth round was made on 25 September 2019. The quarter-final draw was conducted on 31 October, live on BBC Radio 2.

Squad statistics

Appearances
Asterisk (*) indicates player left club during season
Double asterisk (**) indicates player left on loan mid season
Italics indicate a loaned player

|}

Goalscorers

Awards

Club awards
The following players received awards at Leicester's annual award ceremony.

Divisional awards

References

Leicester City
Leicester City F.C. seasons